Small proline-rich protein 2A is a protein that in humans is encoded by the SPRR2A gene.

References

Further reading